Foteina is a village and a community of the Katerini municipality. Before the 2011 local government reform it was part of the municipality of Petra, of which it was a municipal district. The 2011 census recorded 358 residents in the village and 396 in the community.

Administrative division
The villages of Skoteina (1 resident as of 2011) and Petra (37 residents as of 2011) are part of the community of Foteina.

References

See also
Petra
List of settlements in the Pieria regional unit

Populated places in Pieria (regional unit)